Karakoa  were large outrigger warships from the Philippines. They were used by native Filipinos, notably the Kapampangans and the Visayans, during seasonal sea raids. Karakoa were distinct from other traditional Philippine sailing vessels in that they were equipped with platforms for transporting warriors and for fighting at sea. During peacetime, they were also used as trading ships. Large karakoa, which could carry hundreds of rowers and warriors, were known as joangas (also spelled juangas) by the Spanish.

Panday Piray of Pampanga, Philippines was also known for forging heavy bronze lantaka to be mounted on Lakan's (Naval Chief/Commander) ships called 'caracoas' doing battle against the Spanish invaders and cannons were also commissioned by Rajah Sulayman for the fortification of Maynila.

By the end of the 16th century, the Spanish denounced karakoa ship-building and its usage. It later led to a total ban of the ship and the traditions assigned to it. In recent years, the revitalization of karakoa ship-building and its usage are being pushed by some scholars from Pampanga.

Etymology

Karakoa was usually spelled as "" during the Spanish period.

The origin of the names are unknown. Some authors propose that it may have been derived from Arabic  (pl. ) meaning "large merchant ship" via Portuguese  (carrack). However, this is unlikely as the oldest Portuguese and Spanish sources never refer to it as "", but rather "", "" or "". There are also multiple cognates in the names of other vessels of Austronesian vessels (some with no contact with Arab traders) like the Ivatan karakuhan, Malay kolek, Acehnese , Maluku kora kora, Banda , Motu , and the Marshallese korkor. Thus it is more likely that it is a true Malayo-Polynesian word and not a loanword.

Description
Karakoa is a type of balangay (Philippine lashed-lug plank boats). It can be differentiated from other balangay in that they possessed raised decks amidships and on the outriggers, as well as S-shaped outrigger spars. They also had sharply curved prows and sterns, giving the ships a characteristic crescent shape. Their design was also sleeker and faster than other , even though karakoa were usually much larger. Like balangay, they can be used for both trade and war. Their main use, however, were as warships and troop transports during the traditional seasonal sea raids or piracy (especially against European trade ships). They were estimated to have speeds of up to 12 to 15 knots. 

The Spanish priest Francisco Combés described  in great detail in 1667. He was also impressed by the speed and craftsmanship of the vessels, remarking:

Like other outrigger vessels,  had very shallow drafts, allowing them to navigate right up to the shoreline. The hull was long and narrow and was made from lightweight materials. The entire vessel can be dragged ashore when not in use or to protect it from storms.

Strakes were built up along the sides of the keel, forming the hull. They were usually made from lawaan wood (Shorea spp.) and were tightly fitted to the keel and with each other by dowels reinforced further with fiber lashings (usually from sugar palm) on carved lugs. Ribs for support and seating connected the strakes across, which were also lashed together with fiber. The use of dowels and lashings instead of nails made the hull flexible, able to absorb collisions with underwater objects that would have shattered more rigid hulls. Strongly curved planks were fitted at both ends of the keel, giving the ship a crescent-shaped profile. These were usually elaborately carved into serpent or dragon (bakunawa) designs. The anterioposterior symmetry allowed the boat to reverse direction quickly by simply having the rowers turn around in their seats.

 had tripod bamboo masts (two or three in larger vessels), rigged with either crab-claw sails or rectangular tanja sails. The sails were traditionally made from woven plant fibers (like nipa), but were later replaced with materials like linen. In addition to the sails,  had a crew of rowers (usually horohan warriors from the alipin caste) with  paddles, or oars ( or ) on either side of the hull. In between the rowers was an open space used as a passage for moving fore and aft of the ship. Various chants and songs kept the pace and rhythm of the rowers. Above the rowers was a distinctive raised platform made of bamboo where warriors (timawa) and other passengers stood, so as to avoid interfering with the rowers. This platform can be covered by an awning of woven palm leaves during hot days or when it rains, protecting the crew and cargo. Karakoa lacked a central rudder and was instead steered by large oars controlled by the nakhoda (helmsman) seated in a covered structure near the back of the ship. These oars could be raised at a moment's notice to avoid obstructions like shallow reefs.

The hull was connected to the outrigger structure, which was composed of the S-shaped crosswise outrigger spars (tadik) attached to the outrigger floats ( or ) at water level. The  provided stability and additional buoyancy, preventing the boat from capsizing even when the hull is entirely flooded with water. The , like the hull itself, curve upwards at both ends, minimizing drag and preventing rolling.  were usually made with large bamboo poles traditionally fire hardened and bent with heat.

, Spanish for "junk", native  or ).

Sea raiding

 were an integral part of the traditional sea raiding of Filipino thalassocracies. They were maritime expeditions (usually seasonal) against enemy villages for the purposes of gaining prestige through combat, taking plunder, and capturing slaves or hostages (sometimes brides).

If intercepted by defending enemy ships, karakoa can engage in ship-to-ship battles called . The pursuit of enemy ships is called .

Warriors aboard karakoas were shielded from projectiles by removable panels of bamboo or woven nipa, in addition to kalasag personal shields. They were commonly armed with various swords like the kalis and metal-tipped spears called bangkaw. In addition, karakoa also had throwing javelins called , which were thrown in large numbers at enemy ships. Unlike the bangkaw, they didn't have metal tips and were meant to be disposable. They were made from sharpened  (Schizostachyum lumampao) bamboo whose compartments were filled with sand to add weight for throwing. They sometimes had wooden tips laced with snake venom. Short-ranged bows ( or ) were also sometimes used in close-quarter volleys at enemy ships.

Like other ships for trade and war in maritime Southeast Asia, karakoa were also usually armed with one or more bronze or brass swivel guns called lantaka, and sometimes also larger guns.

There was a great deal of honor involved in participating in a raid. Exploits during raids were recorded permanently in the tattoos of Visayan warriors and nobility (timawa and tumao), earning them the name of pintados ("the painted ones") from the Spanish.

See also
Balangay
Lashed-lug boat
Lanong
Garay
Kora kora, similar warships from the Maluku Islands
Outrigger boat
Paraw
Borobudur ship
Jong, large cargo and passenger ship from Java

Notes

References 

Merchant sailing ship types
Naval sailing ship types
Outrigger canoes
Indigenous ships of the Philippines
Multihulls
Tall ships